Idols South Africa X is the tenth season of the South African reality interactive talent show based on the British talent show Pop Idol.

The season's first show was aired on July 13, 2014.

Auditions

Auditions began in February and ended in March. They took place in Johannesburg, Durban, Cape Town and Pretoria.

Audition dates and venues
Carnival City in Johannesburg: Saturday 15 February 2014
The Playhouse in Durban: Saturday 22 February 2014
Grand West Casino and Entertainment World in Cape Town: Sunday 9 March
State Theatre, Pretoria: Saturday 22 March 2014

Performance themes
Top 16: Current Hits Of 2014 (Elimination results: Chante Geary, Olivia Cloud, Mirandi Smith, Rowan DeVillers, Celine Homan)
Top 11: Movie Magic (Elimination results:Ivan Roux and Vincent Verhoog)
Top 9: How It Should Have Been Done (Elimination results:Roxy McVean)
Top 8: Songs From 1994 (Elimination results:Tumi Morobane)
Top 7: Stripped Down (Elimination results:Demi Lee Moore)
Top 6: Showstopper Theme (Elimination results:Musa Mashiane)
Top 5: Albums Of All Time + Most Downloaded Hits Of All Time (Elimination results:Kyle Deutschmann)
Top 4: Old School Vs New School (Elimination results:London Louw)
Top 3: Songs Chosen By The Producers +Songs From The Year You Were Born In + Songs You Wisheed To Perform On The Show (Elimination results:Lize Mynhardt)
Top 2: Songs They Auditioned With + Judge's Favourite Performances + Their Own Singles (Final 2:Bongiwe Silinda and Vincent Bones)

Top 16
First Group

Second Group

 A voting error involving misinformation occurred during the Group 1's voting period with Ivan Roux and Vincent Verhoog's profiles aired with each other's voting numbers, that affected whether one of them had achieved the fourth spot to go to the Top 10. Therefore, in the best interest of the competition, the Producers put both of them into a Top 11, and only three of the remaining 6 contestants from Group 1 will advance to the Top 11 on the Public's vote.

 Prior to the Voting Error, the Top 10 would consist of 8 contestants selected from the two Groups by the Public, and 2 contestants selected by the Judges as their Wildcard picks. This mechanic stayed after the Voting Error was discovered in Group 1's voting period. Demi Lee and Roxy McVean were chosen by the Judges to advance to the Top 11.

Top 11 – Movie Magic
21 September 2014

Guest Mentor: Gordon Chambers
Group performance: "Lost Stars" by Adam Levine

Top 9 – How It Should Have Been Done
28 September 2014

Guest Mentor: AKA
Guest Performances:"Run Jozi" ft. K.O. by AKA"Lonely" by Mark Haze

Elimination chart

References

Season 10
2014 South African television seasons